Woody Côte d'Ivoire is the main West African Bodybuilding contest. Organized by the ABBCI (Association de BodyBuilding de Côte d'Ivoire), it takes place every year at the end of October - beginning of November during the Abissa festivale in Grand-Bassam, Ivory Coast.

WOODY Côte d'Ivoire includes two competitions: the Cote d'Ivoire Bodybuilding championship, reserved to Ivorian bodybuilders, and the Open West Africa in which compete the best West African Bodybuilders.

Winners 

 2005 Abdoulaye Karambiri
 2006 Alassane Sanogo
 2007 Seïdou Dao
 2008 Kofi Salia

External links 
 AfricanMuscle.com

Bodybuilding
Sport in West Africa
African international sports competitions
Sports competitions in Ivory Coast